Carnival Boat is a 1932 American Pre-Code adventure film directed by Albert S. Rogell and written by James Seymour. The film stars William Boyd, Ginger Rogers, Fred Kohler, and Hobart Bosworth. The film was released on March 21, 1932, by RKO Pictures.

Cast
William Boyd as Buck Gannon 
Ginger Rogers as Honey
Fred Kohler as Hack Logan
Hobart Bosworth as Jim Gannon
Marie Prevost as Babe
Edgar Kennedy as Baldy
Harry Sweet as Stubby
Charles Sellon as Lane
Eddy Chandler as Jordon

References

External links
 

1932 films
American black-and-white films
RKO Pictures films
Films directed by Albert S. Rogell
American adventure films
1932 adventure films
1930s English-language films
1930s American films